Shishakovo is a rural locality (a village) in Korobitsynskoye Rural Settlement, Syamzhensky District, Vologda Oblast, Russia. The population was 48 as of 2002.

Geography 
Shishakovo is located 33 km east of Syamzha (the district's administrative centre) by road. Korostelevo is the nearest rural locality.

References 

Rural localities in Syamzhensky District